Cinquecento is the Italian Renaissance of the 16th century. 

Cinquecento may also refer to:

Cinquecento (early music group)
Fiat Cinquecento or Fiat 500
The Piazza dei Cinquecento, named for the 500 Italian soldiers killed at the Battle_of_Dogali, 1887